The Treaty of Paris was signed on March 24, 1515 by Charles V, then only the Count of Flanders and Duke of Burgundy, and Francis I, newly King of France. The treaty was intended to cement an alliance between Charles V and the House of Valois so Charles V would have the support of Francis I in inheriting Spain, and Francis I would not have opposition from Charles V in his rule of France.

The terms of the treaty were that Renée of France (then four years old) would be married to Charles V at the age of twelve with a dowry of 200,000 silver crowns and the Duchy of Berry, and in return Charles V would not help his grandfather Ferdinand against France. The terms of the treaty were not met by either side.

Francis had just acceded to the throne of France in January 1515, so this was an early attempt to establish good relations with a potential future rival. Charles became King of Spain in January 1516, eventually adding King of Italy and Holy Roman Emperor to his titles; his possessions bordered France on all sides. He and Francis were great rivals throughout their reigns.

Sources 

 

1510s in France
Paris (1515)
16th century in Paris
1515 treaties